Pokrovka is a rural locality (a selo) and the administrative center of Pokrovskoye Rural Settlement, Volokonovsky District, Belgorod Oblast, Russia. The population was 915 as of 2010. There are 9 streets.

Geography 
Pokrovka is located 14 km northeast of Volokonovka (the district's administrative centre) by road. Shchepkin is the nearest rural locality.

References 

Rural localities in Volokonovsky District